Lifeway Foods is an Illinois based health food company founded in 1986 that sells kefir.

History
Lifeway Foods was founded by Michael Smolyansky, a Ukrainian Jewish immigrant who arrived in the United States from Kyiv, Ukraine, USSR, in 1976.
During a trip to West Germany, Michael and his wife, Ludmila Smolyansky, realized the kefir sold at a tradeshow was not sold in the United States and decided to start producing it. The company opened its first plant in Skokie, Illinois and continuously grew its operations, eventually turning public. After Michael's death in 2002, his daughter, Julie Smolyansky, took on the role of CEO.

Products
Lifeway's flagship product is kefir. Lifeway sells it in several varieties, including low-fat, non-fat, Greek, organic, and low-carb varieties, as well as these in several different flavors. The company also produces farmer cheese resembling Eastern-European style tvorog and Lifeway Oat, a probiotic Oat milk designed to support the gut.

References

External links
 Lifeway Foods
 Lifeway Kefir

Companies based in Cook County, Illinois
Fermented dairy products
Food and drink companies of the United States